Charles-Fernand de Condamy (1855-1913) was a French animal painter.

References

1855 births
1913 deaths
19th-century French painters
French male painters
20th-century French painters
20th-century French male artists
Animal artists
19th-century French male artists